WKMJ-TV (channel 68) is a Public Broadcasting Service (PBS) member television station licensed to Louisville, Kentucky, United States. It is the flagship station for KET2, the second television service of Kentucky Educational Television (KET), which is owned by the Kentucky Authority for Educational Television.

The station's master control and internal operations are located at KET's main studios at the O. Leonard Press Telecommunications Center in Lexington. WKMJ's transmitter, like those of several other Louisville stations including main KET transmitter WKPC-TV, is located at the Kentuckiana Tower Farm at Floyds Knobs, in Floyd County, Indiana. WKMJ and WKPC are the only KET-owned stations whose transmitters are outside Kentucky's borders.

History

As KET's original Louisville station
When Kentucky Educational Television began broadcasting in 1968, it was built to provide the widest statewide coverage with the fewest transmitters possible. Network officials expected that the transmitters in Elizabethtown (WKZT-TV, channel 23) and Owenton (WKON-TV, channel 54) would provide sufficient service in the Louisville area. Reception, however, was poorer than expected, prompting KET in March 1969 to announce plans to file for UHF channel 68 and strike a deal with WAVE-TV for a new tower, which would also house a stronger WKPC-TV. The station, with the callsign WKMJ (the -TV suffix was added in 1983), began test broadcasts on August 17, 1970, and full service began two weeks later. Channel 68 originally went off the air when the rest of the stations of KET was airing the same programming as WKPC-TV. Duplication remained low, and at the end of 1982, an agreement was reached for WKPC-TV to be the primary PBS outlet in Louisville.

However, after this arrangement, duplication returned. In 1995, after WKPC-TV experienced a series of financial reversals caused by for-profit ventures intended to bolster station income, talks about intending to merge the two stations began, with channel 15—with its stronger signal—becoming the primary KET station. An agreement was reached in December 1996, by which KET acquired certain technical assets, including the land to the Floyds Knobs tower it still shared with WKPC-TV, and the license.

The launch of KET2
On July 1, 1997, KET's main programming moved to WKPC-TV. WKMJ-TV simultaneously suspended operations for a transmitter overhaul; it returned a month later at increased power, carrying a new service called KET2, which initially featured additional children's programs, adult education programming and local productions. Outside of Louisville, KET2 was seen on cable systems statewide.

Digital subchannel history
In 2009, WKMJ-DT2 began broadcasting the Kentucky Channel, simulcasting the DT3 subchannel of all other KET stations. Also in 2009, KET ED became available on WKMJ-DT3, on a 24-hour-a-day basis until September 2009, when WKMJ-DT3 went silent for four years following that linear service's discontinuation. In 2013, WKMJ-DT3 began broadcasting the World network by American Public Television (APT). As the only KET station broadcasting that service, Louisville was the only major market in Kentucky to receive that channel. In late 2020, the KET2 subchannel was upgraded to 720p HD, with KETKY on 68.2 upgraded to widescreen standard definition. This upgrade also took place on the DT2 and DT3 feeds of all other KET satellites.

Programming

As the second service of KET, WKMJ-TV broadcasts the national PBS schedule from the PBS Satellite Service along with additional syndicated programs from American Public Television (including how-to programs, documentaries, and imported comedy and drama series), Kentucky-focused public affairs programs, and some local programming focusing on the Louisville area. , WKMJ-TV does not air children's programming broadcast by PBS or through independent distributors; this is despite that FCC Children's Television Act regulations (which require television stations to air a minimum of three hours of educational children's programming per week) apply to WKMJ, as it transmits the KET2 schedule locally. (While KET2 is simulcast on the DT2 subchannel of KET's other stations, exemptions to Children's Television Act enforcement—as implemented in January 2020—only apply to services transmitted exclusively through subchannels.)

Availability

KET2 was originally available exclusively in the Louisville market over-the-air upon its launch in 1997; some cable systems elsewhere in Kentucky (including systems in Lexington) began to carry the service. The over-the-air statewide relaunch of KET2, via the digital television signals of all KET stations broadcasting the statewide feed, occurred in 2002 by making it available through a second digital subchannel. The 15 principal KET satellites and 3 accompanying digital low-powered translators provide KET2 on their respective DT2 subchannels.

Currently, KET2's cable carriage covers roughly 62% of all subscribers in the state. This includes most Charter Spectrum systems, including all of the state's major cities and several rural areas. It is also available on DirecTV and Dish Network satellite television in the Louisville market. KET2 is also available on cable in Louisville's southern Indiana suburbs.

Digital television

WKMJ-DT
WKMJ-TV began broadcasting its digital television companion signal, WKMJ-DT, in 2003, making it the last television station in the KET system to do so.

Analog-to-digital conversion

On April 16, 2009, WKMJ-TV shut down its analog signal on UHF channel 68 in compliance with the federally-mandated digital television transition. The station's digital signal remained on its pre-transition UHF channel 38. Digital television receivers display the station's virtual channel as 68, its former UHF analog channel, which was one of the upper-band UHF channels (52-69) that was discontinued for broadcast television use with that transition.

Spectrum incentive auction results
In July 2017, WKMJ-TV held a construction permit to move its digital signal to UHF channel 34 as part of the network's participation in the  Spectrum incentive auction. WKMJ's digital signal was reallocated to its new position in October 2019.

ATSC 3.0
On September 19, 2022, at 11 a.m. Eastern Daylight Time, the signal of WKMJ was upgraded to become the first ATSC 3.0 station in the KET system, and the second ATSC 3.0 station in the Louisville market after WBKI.

WKMJ digital channels
WKMJ is the only KET-network station whose subchannels are not configured the same way as the other satellites. The station's signal is multiplexed in this manner:

See also
 Kentucky Educational Television
 List of ATSC 3.0 television stations in the United States

References

External links
 Kentucky Educational Television
 

1970 establishments in Kentucky
Kentucky Educational Television
KMJ-TV
PBS member stations
Television channels and stations established in 1970
ATSC 3.0 television stations